Cameron Wright (born November 7, 1972- ) an American retired high jumper.

He competed at the 1996 Olympic Games without reaching the final.

His personal best jump is 2.30 metres, achieved in June 1996 in Atlanta.

 Missouri valley conference outdoor record holder (2.27 m) 
 Southern Illinois University hall of fame 2011
 5 time NCAA ALL-AMERICAN

Former head track and field coach Southern Illinois University 2000-2004

References

 

1972 births
Living people
American male high jumpers
Athletes (track and field) at the 1996 Summer Olympics
Olympic track and field athletes of the United States